New Zealand competed at the 2016 Summer Olympics in Rio de Janeiro, Brazil, from 5 to 21 August 2016. This was the nation's twenty-third appearance as an independent nation at the Summer Olympics, having made its debut at the 1920 Games and competed at every Games since. The New Zealand team consisted of 199 athletes, 100 women and 99 men, across twenty sports, the first time New Zealand was represented by more women than men at the Summer Olympics.

The New Zealand team collected a total of 18 medals, four gold, nine silver and five bronze, at these Games, surpassing a record of 13 gained at both the 1988 and 2012 Summer Olympics; it also exceeded High Performance Sport New Zealand's (HPSNZ) target of 14 medals for the Games. Athletics (track and field) and sailing led the sports with four medals each, with three medals in each of canoeing and rowing, and one medal in each of cycling, golf, rugby sevens and shooting. Rowers Mahé Drysdale, Hamish Bond and Eric Murray, and sprint canoeist Lisa Carrington successfully defended their Olympic titles, while sailors Peter Burling and Blair Tuke ran away in the 49er class standings and secured their gold-medal victory before the final two races. New Zealand women won the majority of the medals (11), the second time this has happened in the nation's Olympic history (the first was in 1952).

Medal tables
Unless otherwise stated, all dates and times are in Brasília time (UTC−3), fifteen hours behind New Zealand Standard Time (UTC+12).

| width="78%" align="left" valign="top" |

Golfer Lydia Ko (b. 24 April 1997), pole vaulter Eliza McCartney (b. 11 December 1996) and rugby sevens player Terina Te Tamaki (b. 1 May 1997) became the first teenaged women to win an Olympic medal for New Zealand, beating the previous record set by 21-year old Jean Stewart at the 1952 Summer Olympics.

In addition, Nikki Hamblin was awarded a Fair Play award by the International Fair Play Committee for her actions in her 5,000m heat.

|style="text-align:left;width:22%;vertical-align:top;"|

Delegation
The New Zealand Olympic Committee (NZOC) confirmed a team of 199 athletes, 99 men and 100 women, to compete in twenty sports. It is the largest delegation New Zealand has sent to the Olympics, surpassing the 184 athletes who were sent to the 2012 Summer Olympics in London. The nation participated in four more sports than 2012: while not qualifying any competitors in boxing, New Zealand qualified competitors in golf and rugby sevens (both new to the 2016 Games), diving, gymnastics and wrestling. Also missing from the 2016 team is the men's football squad, having been disqualified after fielding an ineligible player in the Olympic qualifying tournament. Rowing had the largest delegation with 36 competitors; diving, judo, taekwondo and wrestling had the smallest delegations with only one competitor each.

For individual sports, the NZOC's overarching selection policy meant it would only consider selecting athletes that were proven capable of making the top 16. For team sports, the NZOC would only consider selecting teams proven capable of advancing beyond the first round.

Seventeen-year-old gymnast Courtney McGregor is New Zealand's youngest competitor, while 62-year-old equestrian dressage rider Julie Brougham is the oldest competitor. Forty-one competitors (20.5 percent) are of Māori descent, including 17 of the 24 rugby sevens players.

A number of past Olympic medallists returned, including defending champions: Valerie Adams (women's shot put), sailors Jo Aleh and Polly Powrie (women's 470 class), flatwater canoeist Lisa Carrington (women's K-1 200m), and rowers Mahé Drysdale (men's single sculls), and Hamish Bond and Eric Murray (men's pair). Sailors Peter Burling and Blair Tuke, who won silver in 2012, were selected as co-captains of the New Zealand team, with Burling acting as flagbearer for the opening ceremony.

| width=78% align=left valign=top |

The following is the list of number of competitors participating in the Games by sport and gender. Note that unused reserves in field hockey, football, and rugby sevens are not counted as competitors:

Officials
In December 2012,  Rob Waddell was appointed New Zealand's chef de mission for the 2014 Commonwealth Games and 2016 Summer Olympics.

Funding
High Performance Sport New Zealand (HPSNZ) invested NZ$158.6 million in elite-level Olympic sports and athletes over the 2013–16 funding cycle, of which $104.0 million was core funding to national sports organisations, while the remaining $54.5 million was mainly in the form of grants and tertiary scholarships to individual athletes. These totals includes funding for non-Olympic and Paralympic events such as world championships and the Commonwealth Games.

Funding breakdown per sport was as follows:

Athletics (track and field)

New Zealand athletes achieved both the IAAF and Athletics New Zealand qualifying standards in the following athletics events (up to a maximum of 3 athletes in each event): The NZOC confirmed the first batch of track and field athletes on 22 April 2016, with Beijing 2008 silver medallist Nick Willis, javelin thrower Stuart Farquhar and two-time shot put champion Valerie Adams going to their fourth Olympics.

Track & road events
Men

Women

Field events

Canoeing

Slalom
New Zealand canoeists qualified a maximum of one boat in each of the following classes through the 2015 ICF Canoe Slalom World Championships. The NZOC named the slalom canoeing squad on 15 April 2016.

Sprint
New Zealand canoeists qualified one boat in each of the following events through the 2015 ICF Canoe Sprint World Championships and the 2016 Oceania Championships. Six paddlers on the sprint canoeing team were named on 31 March 2016, including defending Olympic K-1 200-metre champion Lisa Carrington.

Qualification Legend: FA = Qualify to final (medal); FB = Qualify to final B (non-medal)

Cycling

Road
New Zealand riders qualified for the following quota places in the men's and women's Olympic road race by virtue of their best national ranking in the 2015 UCI Oceania Tour (for men), and top 22 in the 2016 UCI World Ranking (for women).

Track
Following the completion of the 2016 UCI Track Cycling World Championships, New Zealand riders accumulated spots in both men's and women's team pursuit, and men's and women's team sprint, as well as both the men's and women's omnium. As a result of their place in the men's and women's team sprint, New Zealand was assured of its right to enter two riders in both men's and women's sprint and men's and women's keirin. The NZOC confirmed the first four cyclists on 7 April 2016.

Sprint

Team sprint

Qualification legend: FA=Gold medal final; FB=Bronze medal final

Pursuit

Keirin

Omnium

Mountain biking
New Zealand qualified one mountain biker for the men's Olympic cross-country race, as a result of his nation's seventeenth-place finish in the UCI Olympic Ranking List of 25 May 2016. One additional spot was awarded to the female mountain biker, who won the cross-country race for New Zealand at the 2015 Oceania Championships. With Olympic selection criteria requiring riders to show top eight potential, the NZOC decided to only nominate one mountain biker to the Olympic roster, who was Sam Gaze for the men's cross-country event.

BMX
New Zealand riders qualified for one men's quota place in BMX at the Olympics, as a result of the nation's eleventh-place finish in the UCI Olympic Ranking List of 31 May 2016. BMX rider and rookie Trent Jones was selected to the NZ Olympic roster on 10 June 2016.

Diving

New Zealand has received an invitation from FINA to send a diver competing in the women's individual springboard to the Olympics, based on her results at the 2016 FINA World Cup series.

Equestrian

New Zealand equestrians qualified a full squad in the team eventing competition through the 2015 Asia and Pacific Eventing Championships in Boekelo, Netherlands. One dressage rider was later added to the squad by virtue of a top finish from Asia & Oceania in the individual FEI Olympic rankings. New Zealand's equestrian team was named on 27 June 2016. Jock Paget withdrew on 5 August 2016 after his horse, Clifton Lush, cut its cheek at the Rio stable and did not recover in time for the event. Reserve Tim Price and his horse Ringwood Sky Boy subsequently replaced Paget in the individual and team eventing.

Dressage

Eventing

"#" indicates that the score of this rider does not count in the team competition, since only the best three results of a team are counted.

Field hockey

Summary

Men's tournament

The New Zealand men's field hockey team qualified for the Olympics by having achieved the next highest placement in the 2014–15 Men's FIH Hockey World League Semifinals, among the countries that had not qualified yet for the Games.

Team roster

Group play

Quarterfinal

Women's tournament

The New Zealand women's field hockey team qualified for the Olympics by having achieved a top four finish at the second stop of the 2014–15 Women's FIH Hockey World League Semifinals. Only three nations qualified through this route, but South Korea had already secured qualification as continental champions and Brazil failed to meet IOC and FIH criteria to qualify as host nation, opening places up for the fourth-placed teams.

Team roster

Group play

Quarterfinal

Semifinal

Bronze medal match

Football

Women's tournament

The New Zealand women's football team qualified for the Olympics by winning the 2016 OFC Women's Olympic Qualifying Tournament, after Papua New Guinea withdrew from the second leg in Auckland.

Team roster

Group play

Golf

New Zealand entered three golfers (two males and one female) into the Olympic tournament. Danny Lee (world no. 40), Ryan Fox (world no. 184) and Korean-born Lydia Ko (world no. 1) qualified directly among the top 60 eligible players for their respective individual events based on the IGF World Rankings as of 11 July 2016. Cathryn Bristow (world no. 443) also qualified but was not selected.

Gymnastics 

The NZOC confirmed three gymnasts to compete on 11 May 2016, marking the first time that New Zealand gymnasts have competed at the Olympics since 2000, and New Zealand's largest gymnastics team since 1964.

Artistic
Russian-born Mikhail Koudinov and Christchurch's Courtney McGregor claimed their Olympic spots each in the men's and women's apparatus and all-around events, respectively, at the Olympic Test Event in Rio de Janeiro.

Men

Women

Trampoline
For the first time in Olympic history, New Zealand qualified one gymnast in the men's trampoline by virtue of a top six finish at the 2016 Olympic Test Event in Rio de Janeiro.

Judo

New Zealand qualified one judoka for the women's lightweight category (57 kg) at the Games. Darcina Manuel earned a continental quota spot from the Oceania region as New Zealand's top-ranked judoka outside of direct qualifying position in the IJF World Ranking List of 30 May 2016. She was confirmed by the NZOC on 17 June 2016.

Rowing

New Zealand qualified ten out of a possible fourteen boats for each of the rowing classes listed below. The majority of the rowing crews confirmed Olympic places for their boats at the 2015 FISA World Championships in Lac d'Aiguebelette, France, while a women's single sculls rower had added one more boat to the New Zealand roster as a result of a top three finish at the 2016 European & Final Qualification Regatta in Lucerne, Switzerland. The crews had to have also competed at the NZ Rowing Championships, held in Lake Karapiro, to assure their selection to the Olympic team for the Games.

The rowing team was named on 4 March 2016, featuring 2012 Olympic champions Mahé Drysdale in men's single sculls and Hamish Bond and Eric Murray in the men's pair.

On 1 July 2016, the Russian men's quadruple sculls boat was disqualified due to a doping violation, resulting in New Zealand gaining the men's quadruple sculls slot as the next-best non-qualifier.

For the first time in Olympic history, New Zealand rowers participated in the men's lightweight four and the women's eight.

Men

Women

Qualification Legend: FA=Final A (medal); FB=Final B (non-medal); FC=Final C (non-medal); FD=Final D (non-medal); FE=Final E (non-medal); FF=Final F (non-medal); SA/B=Semifinals A/B; SC/D=Semifinals C/D; SE/F=Semifinals E/F; QF=Quarterfinals; R=Repechage

Rugby sevens

Men's tournament

The New Zealand men's rugby sevens team qualified for the Olympics by having achieved one of the top four places at the 2014–15 Sevens World Series. Teddy Stanaway withdrew due to injury, he was replaced by Lewis Ormond. The travelling reserves were Liam Messam and Sione Molia. The New Zealand team lost its tournament opening game against Japan; this was the country's first loss against Japan in any rugby discipline. Sonny Bill Williams received an injury in that match and missed the rest of the tournament, being replaced by Molia.

Team roster

Group play

Quarterfinal

Classification semifinal (5–8)

Fifth place game

Women's tournament

The New Zealand women's rugby sevens team qualified for the Olympics by having achieved one of the top four places at the 2014–15 Sevens World Series.

Team roster

Group play

Quarterfinal

Semifinal

Gold medal match

Sailing

New Zealand qualified one boat for each of the following classes at the 2014 ISAF Sailing World Championships, bringing the maximum quota of 15 sailors, in ten boats. The first ten sailors competing in five double-handed classes were named on 14 March 2016, including defending Olympic champions Jo Aleh and Polly Powrie and 2012 silver medallists Peter Burling and Blair Tuke The remaining two sailors competing in the single-handed classes were named on 10 May 2016.

On 12 March 2016, London 2012 windsurfer JP Tobin announced his decision not to compete at the Games, citing a lack of financial support from Yachting New Zealand (YNZ). On 2 June 2016, the NZ Sports Tribunal and YNZ had upheld their decision not to nominate windsurfer Natalia Kosinska and Laser Radial sailor Sara Winther on the sailing team for failing to achieve the federation's selection standards, following appeals. As a result, New Zealand did not field any windsurfers at the Olympics for the first time in 36 years.

Men

Women

Mixed

M = Medal race; EL = Eliminated – did not advance into the medal race

Shooting

New Zealand shooters achieved quota places for the following events by virtue of their best finishes at the 2014 and 2015 ISSF World Championships, the 2015 ISSF World Cup series, and Oceanian Championships, and obtaining a minimum qualifying score (MQS) before 31 March 2016. The NZOC named the shooting team on 13 April 2016.

Qualification Legend: Q = Qualify for the next round; q = Qualify for the bronze medal (shotgun)

Swimming

New Zealand swimmers achieved qualifying standards in the following events (up to a maximum of 2 swimmers in each event at the Olympic Qualifying Time (OQT), and potentially 1 at the Olympic Selection Time (OST)): To assure their selection to the Olympic team, swimmers attained an Olympic qualifying cut in each of their individual events at the New Zealand Olympic Trials in Auckland (March 28 to April 1) and the Canadian Olympic Trials in Toronto (April 5 to 10).

The NZOC announced the full swimming team on 15 April 2016, including two-time Olympic breaststroker Glenn Snyders and distance freestyle ace Lauren Boyle. Open water swimmer Kane Radford earned an additional place on the NZ Olympic team, as Oceania's top-ranked representative outside the world's top ten of the men's  marathon at the World Olympic Qualifier in Setúbal, Portugal, which was eventually rejected by Swimming New Zealand. On 27 June 2016, Radford was nominated to the NZOC, following his successful appeal to the NZ Sport Tribunal. Boyle, one of New Zealand medal hopes, struggled with illness during her Olympic preparations and did not advance beyond the heat.

Men

Women

Taekwondo

New Zealand entered one athlete into the taekwondo competition. Andrea Kilday secured a spot in the women's flyweight category (49 kg) by virtue of her top finish at the 2016 Oceania Qualification Tournament in Port Moresby, Papua New Guinea.

Tennis

New Zealand entered two tennis players into the Olympic tournament. Marcus Daniell and Michael Venus claimed one of ITF Olympic men's doubles places, as the New Zealand's top-ranked tennis pair outside of direct qualifying position in the ATP World Rankings as of June 6, 2016.

Triathlon

New Zealand has qualified a total of four triathletes for the following events at the Olympics. Two-time Olympian and world no. 2 seed Andrea Hewitt became the first triathlete to secure a spot on the New Zealand team, as a result of her top 10 finish at the ITU World Olympic Qualification Event in Rio de Janeiro. The NZOC confirmed three more triathletes on 25 May 2016.

Weightlifting

New Zealand qualified one male and one female weightlifter for the Rio Olympics by virtue of a top five finish (for men) and top four (for women), respectively, at the 2016 Oceania Championships. The NZOC named the weightlifting team on 28 June 2016.

Wrestling

New Zealand received a spare continental berth freed up by Australia to send a wrestler to compete in the men's Greco-Roman 66 kg to the Olympics, signifying the nation's return to the sport for the first time since 2000. The berth was awarded to Craig Miller, who finished third at the 2016 African & Oceania Qualification Tournament in Algiers, Algeria, after Australian wrestler Vinod Kumar Dahiya was disqualified due to a doping violation. Miller received a knee injury during training in Rio de Janeiro and withdrew before the competition started.

Men's Greco-Roman

Media coverage

The New Zealand Olympic Committee (NZOC) sold exclusive New Zealand broadcasting rights to Sky Television. The games are being screened across 12 subscription based channels: Sky Sport 3 and 4, plus 10 "pop-up" channels. Sky is also showing highlights on its free-to-air channel, Prime.

Sky TV's exclusive rights caused problems with New Zealand's other media outlets. Whilst copyright law allows for "fair dealing", i.e. the reporting of short extracts, Sky TV offered contracts to media outlets that would restrict reporting to well below what the law allows. Sky TV argued that the deal offered to New Zealand media was one of the most accommodating worldwide — the terms were described by Sky TV as "the most reasonable in the world", — however, other media outlets saw it differently. On 19 July, Fairfax New Zealand (owners of Wellington's The Dominion Post and Christchurch's The Press among other newspapers, as well as the Stuff website) and New Zealand Media and Entertainment (NZME; owners of The New Zealand Herald and The Radio Network) announced that they would not send their staff to Rio to report the Olympics. After Fairfax and NZME refused to sign Sky TV's agreement, both companies were served legal papers on 29 July, alleging intended copyright breaches and threatening court injunctions unless they signed the agreement by the following Monday. In a Fairfax editorial published in its newspapers, the blame for the situation was partly put to the NZOC that gave away an exclusive contract but refused to step in when Sky TV offered deals below what was allowed by law.

Sky TV filed for an injunction against Fairfax Media using its footage, saying it was undermining its copyright. Fairfax countered Sky's argument saying the use of its footage was allowed under fair dealing provisions. On 12 August 2016, the High Court dismissed Sky's injunction bid.

See also
New Zealand at the 2016 Summer Paralympics
New Zealand at the Olympics

References

External links 

 

Olympics
Nations at the 2016 Summer Olympics
2016